St. Kevin's Boys Football Club, is an association football club, in Whitehall, in North Dublin, with over forty schoolboy teams who play in the Dublin District Schoolboys League and a number of senior sides who play in the Leinster Senior League.

The club uses playing facilities at Ellenfield Park, Shanowen Road, St. Aidan's CBS, Ward Cross, the Royal College of Surgeons Cloghran, Collinstown, Hampstead Park, and Coolgrena.

In 2018, St. Kevins entered into a player development pathway, a five-year agreement, with Bohemians.

History

Foundation and development
Founded in 1959, by Fr. Des Williams, the club grew into one of the biggest schoolboy clubs in the country, with a number of players progressing on to full time careers in England, and played for the Irish International side. Playing in Ellenfield Park, beside Whitehall Church. In 1984 the club built the clubhouse and hall in Larkhill. In the 2000s, the club developed an all-weather pitch on Shanowen Road, adjacent to their clubhouse in Larkhill.

Academy cup
To commemorate their 50th year, in 2009, the club started the invitational annual St. Kevins Boys Club Academy Cup, which has hosted youth sides (under-13) from many of the best sides in Europe. Academy sides from Ajax, Arsenal, Benfica, Barcelona, Celtic, Deportivo La Coruna, Borussia Dortmund, Genk, Bayer Leverkusen, Olympique Lyonnais, Real Madrid, and West Bromwich Albion have participated in the competition over the years.

Bohemians academy agreement 
In 2018, St. Kevins Boys entered into a player development pathway, a five-year agreement, with Bohemians. The Academy has U13, U15, U17 and U19 teams which all play in the FAI Underage National League.

Notable former players
 Josh Barrett
 Liam Brady
 Robbie Brady
 Jack Byrne
 Stephen Carr
 Ryan Cassidy
 Trevor Clarke
 Damien Duff
 Jimmy Dunne
 Evan Ferguson
 Ronan Finn
 Ian Harte
 Jeff Hendrick
 Danny Mandroiu
 Karl Moore
 Michael O'Connor
 Alex O'Hanlon
 Josh O'Hanlon
 Dara O'Shea
 Eoghan Stokes
 Luke Wade-Slater

References

Athletic Union League (Dublin) clubs
Association football clubs in Dublin (city)